The 1968 Surfers Paradise 4-Hour was an endurance race for Series Production Touring Cars. It was held at the Surfers Paradise International Raceway in Queensland, Australia on 9 June 1968. The race was won by John French, driving
an Alfa Romeo GTV.

Classes
Cars competed in five classes according to the retail price of each model.

Results

References

Further reading
 Surfers' speed, The Courier Mail, Monday, 10 June 1968, page 20

Motorsport at Surfers Paradise International Raceway
Surfers Paradise 4 Hour